The Bosnia and Herzegovina national ice hockey team (Bosnian and Croatian: Hokejaška reprezentacija BiH; Serbian: Хокејашка репрезентација БиХ) is the national men's ice hockey team of Bosnia and Herzegovina. It is a member of the International Ice Hockey Federation through the Bosnia and Herzegovina Ice Hockey Federation.

Withdrawal from 2017 IIHF tournament
Bosnia and Herzegovina decided to withdraw from the 2017 IIHF World Championship Division III tournament in Sofia, Bulgaria, and thus all their games were counted as 5–0 forfeits for the opposing teams.

Tournament record

Olympic Games

World Championships

All-time record against other nations
Last match update: 18 March 2022

Notes

References

External links

IIHF profile
National Teams of Ice Hockey

2008 establishments in Bosnia and Herzegovina
 
Ice hockey teams in Bosnia and Herzegovina
National ice hockey teams in Europe